Wesley David 'Wes' McGaw (6 March 1951 – 5 September 1981) was an Australian rules footballer who played with Collingwood in the Victorian Football League (VFL) and Preston in the Victorian Football Association (VFA).

Notes

External links 

1951 births
1981 deaths
Australian rules footballers from Victoria (Australia)
Collingwood Football Club players
Preston Football Club (VFA) players